Wick is an unincorporated community in Tyler County, West Virginia, United States, along Sugar Creek.

The community most likely was named after the local Wick family.

Notable person
Glen E. Morrell, born May 26, 1936; seventh Sergeant Major of the Army, United States Army.

References 

Unincorporated communities in West Virginia
Unincorporated communities in Tyler County, West Virginia